The 2019–20 Coastal Carolina Chanticleers women's basketball team represented Coastal Carolina University in the 2019–20 NCAA Division I women's basketball season. The Chanticleers, led by seventh year head coach Jaida Williams, played their home games at HTC Center and were members of the Sun Belt Conference. They finished the season 25–4, 15–3 in Sun Belt play to finish in second place. They advanced to the second round of the Sun Belt women's tournament where they lost to Appalachian State. They received a first and second round bye in the postseason tournament and were scheduled to play South Alabama, but it was canceled due to the COVID-19 pandemic before the Chanticleers had the opportunity to play.

Preseason

Sun Belt coaches poll
On October 30, 2019, the Sun Belt released their preseason coaches poll with the Chanticleers predicted to finish in seventh place in the conference.

Sun Belt Preseason All-Conference team

1st team

DJ Williams – SR, Guard

Roster

Schedule

|-
!colspan=9 style=| Non-conference regular season

|-
!colspan=9 style=| Sun Belt regular season

|-
!colspan=9 style=| Sun Belt Women's Tournament

See also
2019–20 Coastal Carolina Chanticleers men's basketball team

References

Coastal Carolina
Coastal Carolina Chanticleers women's basketball seasons